John Michael Beasley (born February 5, 1944) is a retired American professional basketball player born in Texarkana, Texas.

A 6'9" forward/center from Texas A&M University, Beasley was selected in the fifth round of the 1966 NBA Draft by the Baltimore Bullets.  Beasley never played in the NBA, however, spending most of his career with the rival American Basketball Association.

Beasley played seven seasons (1967–1974) in the ABA as a member of the Dallas Chaparrals and Utah Stars, making ABA All-Star Game appearances in 1968, 1969, and 1970.  He was named Most Valuable Player of the 1969 game, following his 19-point and 14 rebound performance for the West squad.  Beasley scored 6,909 total points and grabbed 4,257 total rebounds in his ABA career.

References

External links 

1944 births
Living people
Allentown Jets players
American men's basketball players
Baltimore Bullets (1963–1973) draft picks
Basketball players from Texas
Centers (basketball)
Dallas Chaparrals players
People from Texarkana, Texas
Phillips 66ers players
Power forwards (basketball)
Texas A&M Aggies men's basketball players
Texas Chaparrals players
Utah Stars players